Gustav Ølsted Marcussen (born 12 June 1998) is a Danish professional footballer who plays as a winger for Fremad Amager.

Club career

Lyngby
Marcussen played youth football in HUI, B 1903 and Frem before joining the academy of Lyngby BK. He was promoted to the first team in 2016, where he signed his first professional deal with the club. On 31 August 2016, Marcussen made his official debut for Lyngby, starting in a 3–1 win in the Danish Cup over Frederiksværk FK in the second round. Marcussen made his Danish Superliga-debut for Lyngby on 18 May 2017 in a match against Brøndby IF. He came off the bench in the 87th minute, replacing David Boysen as the match ended in a 0–2 away win for Lyngby. Three days later, he made his second appearance for the club, once again replacing Boysen as Lyngby beat F.C. Copenhagen in a 3–1 home win. Those two appearances were his only during the 2016–2017 season. Marcussen made his first professional goal the following season, scoring an 86th-minute equaliser which secured a 1–1 home draw against SønderjyskE on 12 August 2017. He ended the season with 15 league appearances and the one goal, as Lyngby suffered relegation to the second division. 

The departure of first-team profiles such as Mikkel Rygaard and talents such as Bror Blume, due to relegation and Lyngby's poor financial situation, meant that Marcussen saw more playing time during the 2018–19 season. He had an eventful season, making 28 total appearances in which he scored two goals. The campaign culminated with a third place in the league table and promotion play-offs, which Lyngby won 4–3 over two legs against Vendsyssel FF and thereby secured promotion back to the Superliga after one year. Prior to the new Superliga-season, Marcussen signed a new contract with Lyngby on 25 June 2019, keeping him a part of De Kongeblå until 2021.

Uerdingen 05
On 23 September 2020, it was announced that Marcussen had moved to German 3. Liga club Uerdingen 05. He made his debut for the club on 4 October in a 0–0 draw against Hansa Rostock. He scored his first goal for the club on 24 October in a 2–0 away win over MSV Duisburg.  For Uerdingen he made 25 appearances and scored four goals, but he was only in the starting line-up in eleven games. After Uerdingen had their license to play in the 3. Liga revoked due to financial problems, Marcussen terminated his contract on 3 June 2021.

Silkeborg
After a trial, Marcussen joined Danish Superliga club Silkeborg IF on 30 July 2021, signing a deal for the rest of 2021. He made his debut for the club on 15 August, coming on as a substitute in the 74th minute for Mads Kaalund in a 1–1 league draw against OB. Marcussen left the club again at the end of the year.

Fremad Amager
On 12 January 2022, Marcussen joined Danish 1st Division club Fremad Amager on a deal until 2024.

International career
Marcussen has represented Denmark at every age group from under-18 to under-21 level. On 22 March 2018, he made his first appearance for the Denmark under-21 team in a 5–0 friendly win over Austria in Wiener Neustadt.

Career statistics

References

External links
 
 
 

Living people
1998 births
Association football midfielders
Danish men's footballers
Boldklubben 1903 players
Boldklubben Frem players
Lyngby Boldklub players
KFC Uerdingen 05 players
Silkeborg IF players
Fremad Amager players
Danish Superliga players
Danish 1st Division players
3. Liga players
Danish expatriate men's footballers
Expatriate footballers in Germany
Danish expatriate sportspeople in Germany